The NASCAR AutoZone Elite Division, Southwest Series (originally NASCAR Featherlite Southwest Tour) was a late model stock car racing series sanctioned by NASCAR that was held in the Southwestern United States. The original NASCAR Southwest Tour began in 1985 and ran until NASCAR discontinued the Elite Division in 2006.

The cars feature a perimeter frame chassis where rails of equal lengths must kick out, compared to the more modern offset chassis where one side is straight and one side kicks out.  They weigh 2,900 pounds and have a fiberglass body.

When NASCAR eliminated the Elite Division at the end of the 2006 season, several competitors joined former IRL driver Davey Hamilton's SRL Southwest Tour.

Champions

NASCAR AutoZone Elite Division, Southwest Series
 2006: Rip Michels
 2005: Jim Pettit II
 2004: Jim Pettit II
 2003: Auggie Vidovich

NASCAR Featherlite Southwest Tour
 2002: Eddy McKean
 2001: Craig Raudman
 2000: Matt Crafton
 1999: Kurt Busch
 1998: Steve Portenga
 1997: Brian Germone
 1996: Chris Raudman
 1995: Lance Hooper
 1994: Steve Portenga
 1993: Ron Hornaday Jr.
 1992: Ron Hornaday Jr.
 1991: Rick Carelli
 1990: Doug George
 1989: Dan Press
 1988: Roman Calczynski
 1987: Mike Chase
 1986: Ron Esau

References

External links
NASCAR Southwest Series archive at Racing-Reference
NASCAR Southwest Series archive at The Third Turn

NASCAR series
Stock car racing series in the United States
Sports in the Western United States